PhotoFiltre is a freeware image editing and effects program published by Antonio Da Cruz. It is considered to be a portable application.

Reviewers have praised PhotoFiltre for its simplicity and interface compared to more complex and resource-heavy image editing programs.

Other reviews:

References

External links
 

Freeware